In Māori tradition, Māhuhu-ki-te-rangi (also known as Māhuhu) was one of the great ocean-going, voyaging canoes that was used in the migrations that settled New Zealand.

According to Māori traditions, the waka Māhuhu-ki-te-rangi explored the upper reaches of the North Island north of the Kaipara Harbour during early Māori settlement of New Zealand. Its crew explored Whangaroa, Tākou and Whangaruru. They continued south before returning to Pārengarenga and sailing down the west coast.

On the west coast there are two narratives of the captaincy of Māhuhu. Te Roroa people of the Waipoua forest say the Māhuhu canoe was captained by Whakatau and called at Kawerua on the west coast of the North Island where Whakatau's son married a local. The alternative narrative, told by the Te Uri-o-Hau and Te Taoū (from the Ngāti Whātua tribe of Helensville and Auckland) has Māhuhu under the command of Rongomai and stopping not at Kawerua but Tāporapora Island in the Kaipara Harbour (this island no longer exists). Rongomai was drowned when the canoe overturned after visiting the island and his body was eaten by the araara or trevally fish. Because of this incident, the Nga Puhi and Te Rarawa iwi who claim descent from Rongomai, did not dare to eat the trevally in the times before they embraced Christianity. The tradition then tells of Māhuhu heading back north to Rangaunu Harbour where the crew eventually settled. At the end of its service the waka was interred in a creek, Te Waipopo-o-Māhuhu in the Rangaunu Harbour.

As part of the 1990 commemorations of the 1840 signing of the Treaty of Waitangi, Ngāti Whātua made a large waka which also bears the name Māhuhu-ki-te-rangi or Māhuhu-o-te-rangi.

See also
List of Māori waka

References

E. Shortland, Traditions & Superstitions of the New Zealanders (Longman, Brown: London), 1856, 25.
E.R. Tregear, Maori-Polynesian Comparative Dictionary, (Lyon and Blair: Lambton Quay), 1891, 20–21.

Māori waka
Māori mythology